The 2018–19 season was Manchester United Women's inaugural season following the club's successful application to join the newly-formed FA Women's Championship after a league restructuring. The club also competed in the FA Cup and League Cup. The team played their home games at Leigh Sports Village, while the training ground at The Cliff undergoes redevelopment.

Pre-season 
In March 2018, Manchester United announced their intentions to enter a women's team into the second tier of the 2018–19 season. Their application was confirmed in May and they were announced as one of four new teams to enter the division alongside Charlton Athletic, Leicester City and Lewes F.C.

On 8 June 2018, former England international Casey Stoney was announced as head coach. The full 21-player squad was revealed in July and included the return of Katie Zelem, Emily Ramsey, Naomi Hartley, Fran Bentley, Millie Turner, Kirsty Hanson and Ella Toone who were all previously part of the club's Girls' Regional Talent Club and Centre of Excellence.

United's first game was a behind-closed-doors friendly against Liverpool on 15 July. The game had to be abandoned after goalkeeper Siobhan Chamberlain was taken to hospital with a suspected serious neck injury which was later confirmed not as serious as first thought.

FA Women's Championship

Matches
On 1 August 2018, the FA Women's Championship announced the fixtures for the 2018–19 season. The team confirmed promotion to the FA WSL on 17 April 2019 after victory over Aston Villa with three games to spare. Three days later, they clinched the Championship title with a win at home to Crystal Palace.

League table

Women's FA Cup 

Manchester United entered the Women's FA Cup in the fourth round with the rest of the top two tiers and were drawn against WSL side Brighton & Hove Albion. Lauren James' brace earned United a 2–0 win to put them in the draw for the fifth round. They were drawn against fellow Championship side London Bees who United had already scored 14 goals against across their two league meetings. United progressed to the quarter-finals with a 3–0 win, held at back-up venue Ewen Fields, and were drawn against Reading to set up the second cup meeting between the two teams after Reading triumphed in the WSL Cup Group Stage earlier in the season. The WSL side triumphed for a second time, taking United to extra-time after a goalless 90 minutes before eventually winning 3–2 with Rakel Hönnudóttir's late winner coming in the 120+2 minute.

FA Women's League Cup

Group stage 
Manchester United were entered into Group Two North for the 2018–19 FA WSL Cup alongside WSL sides Liverpool, Everton and Reading and fellow Championship side Durham. They played two games at home and two away, winning three including both away ties to Merseyside teams.

Knockout phase 
The draw for the quarter-final was made on 18 December, with Manchester United the only team from outside of the FA WSL to qualify from the group stage. They were drawn against West Ham United who had finished second in Group Two South behind defending champions Arsenal. After beating West Ham 2–0, United progressed to the semi-finals and were drawn against Arsenal. The tie was televised nationally on BT Sport as Arsenal won 2–1 to progress to their seventh final in eight years.

Squad statistics 

Numbers in brackets denote appearances as substitute.
Key to positions: GK – Goalkeeper; DF – Defender; MF – Midfielder; FW – Forward

Transfers

In

Loans out

References

External links
  

2018-19
Manchester United